The Journal of Sociology is a quarterly peer-reviewed academic journal covering sociology with a focus on Australia. The journal's editors-in-chief are Steve Matthewman (University of Auckland) and Kate Huppatz (University of Western Sydney). It was established in 1965 and is published by SAGE Publications on behalf of The Australian Sociological Association.

Abstracting and indexing 
The journal is abstracted and indexed in Scopus and the Social Sciences Citation Index. According to the Journal Citation Reports, its 2013 impact factor is 1.455.

References

External links 
 

Sociology journals
Publications established in 1965
SAGE Publishing academic journals
Quarterly journals
English-language journals